Konstanze's Delight is an album by American jazz saxophonist Jemeel Moondoc, which was recorded live at the Third Street Music School in 1981 and released on the Italian Soul Note label. He leads a sextet that features Muntu's members Roy Campbell on trumpet and William Parker on double bass, occasional members Khan Jamal on vibraphone and Ellen Christi on wordless vocals, and Denis Charles on drums.

Reception

The Penguin Guide to Jazz notes "The two horns seem to be engaged in a game of one-on-one ball, chasing, dodging, body-checking and setting up half a dozen false climaxes before the whole thing unwinds."

Track listing
All compositions by Jemeel Moondoc
"Konstanze's Delight" - 29:46
"Chasing the Moon" - 13:17
"High Rise" - 2:21

Personnel
Roy Campbell - trumpet
Jemeel Moondoc - alto sax
Khan Jamal - vibraphone
William Parker - bass
Denis Charles - drums
Ellen Christi - voice

References

1983 live albums
Jemeel Moondoc live albums
Black Saint/Soul Note live albums